is a Renju title in Japan. The Meijin-sen tournament is one of the most important Renju tournaments in Japan.

History and Rule 
The first Meijin-sen tournament is organized by the Japanese Renju Federation in 1962. Since then, the tournament is played every year except for 1974. During every year with the Meijin title match, two rounds of qualification tournaments are held in parallel in different regions of Japan. The A-class league is made up of 10 players, which are composed of winners of different qualification tournaments, together with three seeds from the last tournament. A round-robin tournament is held among the A-class league, and the winner of the A-class league becomes the challenger of that year. Then a 5-round match is held between the challenger and current title holder. If the challenger gets at least 3 points from 5 games, he wins the match and gains the Meijin title. Otherwise, the current holder keeps the title.

Past winners

Lifetime Meijin

Lifetime Meijin is a lifetime honorable title which is given to Japanese Renju players. Before the Meijin-sen tournaments were launched in 1962, the title of Lifetime Meijin was awarded to the players who had made outstanding contributions to the development of Renju. Since 1962, the title is awarded to the players who have outstanding performance in the Meijin-sen tournaments.

Before 1962
Before the Meijin-sen tournaments were started, there were five Japanese players who were awarded the title of Lifetime Meijin.

 1st: Goraku Takayama (Kuroiwa Ruikō)
 2nd: Yūseki Mikami
 3rd: Rakuzan Takagi
 4th: Hōrō Yamakabe
 5th: Gozui Sakata

After 1962
After 1962, the title of Lifetime Meijin is awarded to the outstanding players who have won the Meijin title for at least 7 times in total, or 5 times in a row. A player who meets the above conditions can get this title when he is at least 60 years old.

Up to 2023, there are three players who have won this title is this way:

 6th: Taizan Isobe
 7th: Shigeru Nakamura
 8th: Kazuto Hasegawa

See also
Renju
Gomoku
World Championships in Renju

References

Renju competitions
Recurring sporting events established in 1962
Annual sporting events